Wayne Garner (born May 8, 1951) is an American politician. He served as a  Democratic member for the 30th district of the Georgia State Senate.

Life and career 
Garner was born in Fulton County, Georgia. He attended Douglas County High School and the University of West Georgia.

In 1980, Garner was elected to represent the 30th district of the Georgia State Senate, serving until 1994.

References 

1951 births
Living people
People from Fulton County, Georgia
Democratic Party Georgia (U.S. state) state senators
20th-century American politicians
University of West Georgia alumni